, better known as his stage name , is a Japanese voice actor from Tōkyō Metropolis attached to Arts Vision. He was formerly attached to Production Baobab. His voice has been compared to those of Shinji Nakae and Gorō Naya.

Filmography

Television animation
1960s
Astro Boy (1963) – Captain
Kimba the White Lion (1965) – Hurley
Princess Knight (1967) – King Charcoalland
Kamui the Ninja (1969) – Miwata
1970s
New Star of Giants (1977) – Tatsuro Hirooka
Lupin The Third Part II (1979) – Robert
Monarch: The Big Bear of Tallac (1977) – Keryan
Uchū Majin Daikengō (1978) – Dareth
1980s
The Flying House (1982) – Jesus Christ
Galactic Whirlwind Sasuraiger (1983) – John Anrock
Special Armored Battalion Dorvack (1983) – Gordon
Panzer World Galient (1984) – Dartath
1990s
Future GPX Cyber Formula (1991) – Gavane
Trapp Family Story (1991) – Kurt Schuschnigg
H2 (1995) – Kantoku Shiroyama
Jura Tripper (1995) – King Ariharis
Eat-Man (1997) – Sadler
2000s
Star Ocean: The Second Story (2001) – Harvest
Kino's Journey (2003) – Kino's father
Zatch Bell! (2003) – Li-en's father
Mushishi (2005) – Ayako's father
2010s
Nobunaga Concerto (2014) – Isono Kazumasa

OVA
Patlabor (1988) – Kiyoteru Kai
Mobile Suit Gundam 0080: War in the Pocket (1989) – Ems Izuruha
Legend of the Galactic Heroes (1991) – Oskar von Reuenthal's father
Mobile Suit Gundam 0083: Stardust Memory (1991) – Dick Allen (second episode)
DNA² (1995) – Mori
The Silent Service (1995) – Terrence B. Carver
Ninja Resurrection (1998) – Toda Godayu

Theatrical animation
Final Yamato (1983) – EDF Officer
Doraemon: Nobita's Dorabian Nights (1991) – Harun al-Rashid
Crayon Shin-chan: Pursuit of the Balls of Darkness (1997) – Hexon
Sword of the Stranger (2007) – Zekkai
Death Billiards (2013) – Elderly Man

Video games
Tales of Rebirth (2004) – Randgriz

Dubbing roles

Live-action
48 Hrs. (1990 NTV edition) – Captain Haden (Frank McRae)
Air America – Senator Davenport (Lane Smith)
Batman – Harvey Dent (Billy Dee Williams)
Bill & Ted's Excellent Adventure – Sigmund Freud (Rod Loomis)
Bulletproof – Capt. Will Jensen (James Farentino)
Capricorn One (1981 TV Asahi edition) – Lt. Col. Peter Willis (Sam Waterston)
Clear and Present Danger – Jim Greer (James Earl Jones)
Dawn of the Dead (1980 TV Tokyo edition) – Sidney Berman (David Early)
Extreme Justice – Captain Shafer (Ed Lauter)
The French Connection – Laserdisc edition) – Pierre Nicoli (Marcel Bozzuffi)
Hellraiser (1990 TV Tokyo edition) – Pinhead (Doug Bradley)
Houston Knights – Mikey (Richard Bright)
JFK – Guy Banister (Ed Asner)
Mac and Me – Wickett (Martin West)
No Way Out – David Brice (Gene Hackman)
North to Alaska – Frankie Canon (Ernie Kovacs)
The Running Man (1990 TV Asahi edition) – Fireball (Jim Brown)
Star Trek V: The Final Frontier – Captain James T. Kirk (William Shatner)
Star Trek VI: The Undiscovered Country – General Chang (Christopher Plummer)
Star Wars Episode V: The Empire Strikes Back (1980 Movie theater edition) – General Veers (Julian Glover)
Star Wars Episode V: The Empire Strikes Back (1986 NTV edition) – Admiral Piett (Kenneth Colley)
They Live (1990 TV Asahi edition) – Gilbert (Peter Jason)
Tomorrow Never Dies – Admiral Roebuck (Geoffrey Palmer)
The Unseen – Tony Ross (Douglas Barr)
V (1988 NTV edition) – Martin Philip (Frank Ashmore)
Wall Street (1992 TV Asahi edition) – Trader (Oliver Stone)
Way of the Dragon – Jimmy (Unicorn Chan)

Animation
Batman: The Animated Series – Roland Daggett
Darkwing Duck – Negaduck
Howard the Duck (1990 Fuji TV edition) – Doctor Jenning/The Dark Overlord
Yogi Bear – Ranger Smith

References

External links
Arts Vision profile
 

1934 births
Japanese male voice actors
Living people
Male voice actors from Tokyo Metropolis
20th-century Japanese male actors
21st-century Japanese male actors
Arts Vision voice actors
Production Baobab voice actors